The 1999 Franklin Templeton Tennis Classic was an Association of Tennis Professionals men's tennis tournament held in Scottsdale, Arizona in the United States that was part of the ATP World Series of the 1999 ATP Tour. It was the 12th edition of the tournament and was held from March 1 to March 8, 1999. Unseeded Jan-Michael Gambill won the singles title.

Finals

Singles

 Jan-Michael Gambill defeated  Lleyton Hewitt, 7–6(7–2), 4–6, 6–4.
 It was Gambill's only title of the year and the 1st of his career.

Doubles

 Justin Gimelstob /  Richey Reneberg defeated  Mark Knowles /  Sandon Stolle, 6–4, 6–7(4–7), 6–3.
 It was Gimelstob's 1st title of the year and the 3rd of his career. It was Reneberg's only title of the year and the 21st of his career.

References

External links
 ITF tournament edition details

Franklin Templeton Classic
 
Tennis Channel Open
Franklin Templeton Classic
Franklin Templeton Classic
Franklin Templeton Classic